RFA Wave Laird (A119) was an  Wave-class fleet support tanker of the Royal Fleet Auxiliary. She was built in 1946 as Empire Dunbar by Sir J Laing & Sons Ltd, Sunderland, Co Durham for the Ministry of Transport and completed at Wave Laird. She served until 1961 when she was laid up at HMNB Devonport. Wave Laird was scrapped in 1970 in Spain.

Description
The ship was built in 1946 by Sir J Laing & Sons Ltd, Sunderland. She was yard number 767.
Fully loaded, she displaced 16,650 tons.

The ship was propelled by two Metrovick-type double reduction geared steam turbines, which were fed by three drum boilers. .

History
Empire Dunbar  was built by Sir J Laing & Sons Ltd, Sunderland for the Ministry of Transport. She was launched on 3 April 1946 and completed on 30 September 1946 as RFA Wave Laird for the Royal Fleet Auxiliary. Her port of registry was London. She was allocated the United Kingdom Official Number 180967 and the Pennant number X129. This was later changed to A119.

Wave Laird suffered a number of problems shortly after entering service. In October 1946, her steering gear failed on a voyage from Sunderland to the Tyne and she was towed into port. In December 1946, boiler problems delayed her departure from Portland, Dorset for Trinidad. Assistance was requested as the ship suffered heavy damage, which had to be repaired before her cargo was able to be discharged at Old Kilpatrick. 
On 10 November 1949, Wave Laird was on a voyage from Abadan, Iran to Malta when she was caught in a storm. A deckhand sustained fatal injuries. He was buried at Kalkara Naval Cemetery in Malta.

Wave Laird was on active service in Korea from 25 June 1950 to 27 July 1953. She was awarded a battle honour. In January 1954, Wave Laird was one of the naval vessels supporting the Royal Yacht  in Australia. On 31 October 1956, Wave Laird was one of 35 Royal Fleet Auxiliary ships deployed as part of Operation Musketeer. From 16–29 September 1960, she was deployed off Iceland in support of the Royal Navy, which was caught up in the Cod Wars. Wave Laird was featured on a postcard produced by Valentine's, Dundee. The card showed Wave Laird refuelling  at sea.

Wave Laird was laid up in reserve at HMNB Devonport in 1961. She was advertised for sale by tender in November 1969 "as lying at HMNB Devonport". She departed from Devonport under tow on 26 January 1970, bound for Gibraltar, from where she departed on 25 February under tow for Gandia, Spain. Wave Laird was scrapped in March 1970 by Hierros Ardes, Gandia.

References

External links
Colour photo of Wave Laird

1946 ships
Ships built on the River Wear
Empire ships
Steamships of the United Kingdom
Wave-class oilers
Tankers of the Royal Fleet Auxiliary
Maritime incidents in 1947
Maritime incidents in 1951